The 2012 Dutch TT was the seventh round of the 2012 Grand Prix motorcycle racing season. It was the 82nd Dutch TT, and took place on the weekend of 28–30 June 2012 at the TT Circuit Assen.

MotoGP classification

Moto2 classification

Moto3 classification

Championship standings after the race (MotoGP)
Below are the standings for the top five riders and constructors after round seven has concluded.

Riders' Championship standings

Constructors' Championship standings

 Note: Only the top five positions are included for both sets of standings.

References

Dutch TT
Dutch
Tourist Trophy
Dutch TT